Gosichon, also called Goshichon or Goshi Village, is a Korean term used to refer to residences of civil service examinees.

Etymology
The origin of the term is from "Gosi" and "Chon", literally "town of civil service examinees".

History
One of the notable goshichons in Sillim-dong, Gwanak District formed in 1975 due to campuses of Seoul National University moving to the area.

References

Standardized tests in South Korea